, also known as Yakimeshi (Japanese: 焼飯), is a Japanese fried rice dish prepared with rice as a primary ingredient and myriad additional ingredients and seasonings. The dish is typically fried, and can be cooked in a wok. Chahan may have originated in the 1860s from Chinese immigrants arriving at the port of Kobe. Chahan is a staple food in homes in Japan. A variation of the dish is takana chahan. Some restaurants outside Japan serve the dish as a part of their fare.

History
Chahan may have originated from Chinese immigrants who arrived at the port of Kobe, Japan in the 1860s. In Chinese, fried rice is called chǎofàn; these same Chinese characters have a Japanese reading of Chāhan.

Preparation
Chahan is a Japanese fried rice dish that is typically fried, and can be cooked by stir frying it in a wok. Rice is used as a primary ingredient, and myriad additional ingredients can be used, such as vegetables, onion, garlic, edible mushrooms such as shiitake, tofu, pork, pork belly, seafoods such as crab meat, roe, salmon, shrimp and octopus, scrambled egg, ground beef and chicken broth, among others. Pre-cooked rice is typically used, and leftover rice is sometimes used. Oils such as canola oil, sesame oil and sunflower oil are used to fry the dish. The dish can be seasoned with soy sauce, oyster sauce, sesame oil, salt, pepper and katsuobushi, a dried and flaked tuna product. Shiso, an Asian culinary herb, may also be used to flavor chahan. Nori, a dried edible seaweed product, can be used as a garnish.

The use of a hot wok for frying and cooking chahan quickly can prevent the rice from sticking to the pan, and using warm rice also prevents pan sticking. The use of dried cooked rice, which can be accomplished by refrigerating it, is also conducive toward enhancing the cooking process.

Variations
Takana chahan is prepared with takanazuke (pickled takana) as a primary ingredient, and so popular in Japan indeed.

See also

 Japanese cuisine
 List of fried rice dishes
 List of Japanese dishes
 List of rice dishes

References

External links

 Gomoku Chahan Features Rice and Seasonal Ingredients. PBS.

Chinese fusion cuisine
Fried rice
Japanese rice dishes
Japanese fusion cuisine